Bir Dhandoli  is a village in Phagwara Tehsil in Kapurthala district of Punjab State, India. The village is administrated by a Sarpanch who is an elected representative of village as per the constitution of India and Panchayati raj (India).

Transport 
Phagwara Junction Railway Station,  Mauli Halt Railway Station are the very nearby railway stations to Bir Dhandoli however, Jalandhar City Rail Way station is 23 km away from the village.  The village is 118 km away from Sri Guru Ram Dass Jee International Airport in Amritsar and the another nearest airport is Sahnewal Airport  in Ludhiana which is located 40 km away from the village.  Phagwara , Jandiala , Jalandhar , Phillaur are the nearby Cities to Bir Dhandoli village.

References

External links
  Villages in Kapurthala
 Kapurthala Villages List

Villages in Kapurthala district